The 1997–98 Arkansas Razorbacks men's basketball team represented the University of Arkansas in the 1997–98 college basketball season. The head coach was Nolan Richardson, serving for his 13th year. The team played its home games in Bud Walton Arena in Fayetteville, Arkansas.

Roster

Schedule and results

|-
!colspan=9 style=| Regular Season

|-
!colspan=9 style=| SEC Tournament

|-
!colspan=9 style=| NCAA Tournament

Rankings

References

Arkansas
Arkansas
Arkansas Razorbacks men's basketball seasons
Razor
Razor